Dearborn Heights is a city in Wayne County in the U.S. state of Michigan. With a population of 63,292 at the 2020 census., Dearborn Heights is part of the Detroit metropolitan area, and is considered a bedroom community.

History
Dearborn Heights was incorporated from the two discontinuous sections of Dearborn Township and a quarter-mile connecting strip of land from the village of Inkster.  Incorporation petitions were filed on Friday, March 4, 1960, while Inkster officials delivered their petitions for incorporation on Monday, March 7, 1960.  The residents approved Dearborn Heights' incorporation on an election held June 20, 1960, which is the official date of incorporation. Inkster, a predominantly black community, filed a lawsuit, claiming that the shape of Dearborn Heights reflected a racial gerrymander.  The Michigan Supreme Court held that Inkster had failed to demonstrate any legally cognizable harm and dismissed the lawsuit.

Geography

The southern portion of the city is in the watershed of the north branch of the Ecorse Creek (also known as Ecorse River). The area surrounding the Ecorse is subject to flooding. The northern portion of the city is in the Rouge River watershed.

Demographics

By 2014 Arab Americans had been moving into the city, with the north end having more Arabs compared to the south end. Many Arab businesses in Dearborn established branch operations in Dearborn Heights. In 2014 the Dearborn Heights director of community and economic development, Ron Amen, stated that Arabs are about 25% of the city's population.

2010 census
As of the census of 2010, there were 57,774 people, 22,266 households, and 14,591 families living in the city. The racial makeup of the city was 86.1% White, 7.9% African American, 0.4% Native American, 1.7% Asian, 1.0% from other races, and 2.8% from two or more races. Hispanic or Latino of any race were 4.7% of the population.

There were 22,266 households, of which 32.1% had children under the age of 18 living with them, 46.0% were married couples living together, 13.9% had a female householder with no husband present, 5.7% had a male householder with no wife present, and 34.5% were non-families. 30.1% of all households were made up of individuals, and 13.5% had someone living alone who was 65 years of age or older. The average household size was 2.57 and the average family size was 3.23.

The median age in the city was 38.3 years. 25% of residents were under the age of 18; 8.6% were between the ages of 18 and 24; 25.2% were from 25 to 44; 25.2% were from 45 to 64; and 16.1% were 65 years of age or older. The gender makeup of the city was 48.4% male and 51.6% female.

2000 census
As of the census of 2000, there were 58,264 people, 23,276 households, and 15,781 families living in the city. The racial makeup of the city was 91.64% White, 2.12% African American, 0.37% Native American, 2.24% Asian, 0.01% Pacific Islander, 0.81% from other races, and 2.81% from two or more races. Hispanic or Latino of any race were 3.39% of the population. 19.8% were of Polish, 12.3% German, 8.8% Arab, 8.3% Italian, 8.0% Irish and 5.3% English ancestry according to Census 2000. 82.1% spoke English, 6.6% Arabic, 2.3% Polish, 2.1% Spanish, 1.5% Italian and 1.0% Macedonian as their first language.

There were 23,276 households, out of which 27.5% had children under the age of 18 living with them, 52.7% were married couples living together, 10.8% had a female householder with no husband present, and 32.2% were non-families. 28.0% of all households were made up of individuals, and 13.0% had someone living alone who was 65 years of age or older.  The average household size was 2.47 and the average family size was 3.04.

In the city, the population was spread out, with 22.5% under the age of 18, 7.5% from 18 to 24, 29.5% from 25 to 44, 21.7% from 45 to 64, and 18.7% who were 65 years of age or older.  The median age was 39 years. For every 100 females, there were 93.2 males.  For every 100 females age 18 and over, there were 90.4 males.

The median income for a household in the city was $48,222, and the median income for a family was $54,392. Males had a median income of $45,226 versus $29,234 for females. The per capita income for the city was $22,829.  About 4.4% of families and 6.1% of the population were below the poverty line, including 8.5% of those under age 18 and 4.7% of those age 65 or over.

Economy
As of 2014 the largest employer in the city is the city government itself. The second largest employer is H.Y.P.E Athletics, which has over 200 employees.

Dearborn Heights Tax Increment Finance Authority (TIFA)
Since TIFA's establishment in 1986, many projects have been completed, including the new Justice Center and JFK Library. The Dearborn Heights Tax Increment Finance Authority is a community service office branched out of the State of Michigan and the City of Dearborn Heights. The goal is to encourage economic revitalization and historic preservation. TIFA remains established to continue efforts in elevating the standard of living for all residents of the district.

Property availability listA property availability list (PAL) is regularly updated on the TIFA website. It is a comprehensive list of all commercial and industrial parcels for sale in the district, which provides the browser with property specifications and contact information for the appropriate real estate agent. The goal of the PAL is not to promote or advocate businesses, but rather to avoid vacancies and assist in the occupancy of commercial buildings in the district, in turn stimulating the local economy.

Recent programsThe Business Improvement Program was launched in June 2008. It is a grant program designed to assist business owners in the TIFA district who wish to repair structural or exterior deterioration of their buildings.

Education

Primary and secondary schools

Public schools

Dearborn Heights is divided into five school districts. Most north end residents are in the Crestwood School District or Dearborn Public Schools, while south end residents fall into the Westwood Community School District or the Dearborn Heights No. 7 School District. There are three zoned high Schools within the Dearborn Heights city limits: Crestwood High School on Beech Daly Road (Crestwood School District), Robichaud High School on Janet Street (Westwood Community Schools), and Annapolis High School on Clippert Street (Dearborn Heights District No. 7).

Dearborn Center for Math, Science and Technology, a Dearborn schools magnet school, is in Dearborn Heights. Residents in Dearborn Public Schools are zoned to either River Oaks (in Dearborn Heights), Haigh, or Lindberg elementary schools. Middle schools serving that section include Bryant and Smith. Dearborn High School serves all residents of Dearborn Heights in Dearborn schools.

A small portion is within the Wayne-Westland Community Schools. It is zoned to Hicks Elementary School in Inkster, Marshall Upper Elementary School in Westland, Stevenson Middle School in Westland, and John Glenn High School in Westland.

Portions of Dearborn Heights in the Taylor School District are assigned to Taylor Parks Elementary School, Hoover Middle School, and Harry S. Truman High School, all in Taylor.

Charter schools:
 Clara B. Ford Academy is in Dearborn Heights.
 Global Educational Excellence operates one charter school in Dearborn Heights: Global Heights Academy (K-5).
Prior to 2011, Universal Learning Academy had two campuses in Dearborn Heights. It is now in Westland.

Private schools
The Roman Catholic Archdiocese of Detroit operates two Catholic K-8 schools:
 St. Anselm Catholic School - Established in 1955
 St. Linus Catholic School (Dearborn Heights)

The archdiocese once operated St. Mel Elementary School in Dearborn Heights, which closed in 2005, and St. Sebastian School, which was established in the 1950s and closed in 2019. It also once operated St. Albert the Great.

Post-secondary education
A campus of Henry Ford College was located in the north end from the mid-1970s until 2014.

Public libraries
The Dearborn Heights Library System operates the Caroline Kennedy Library and the John F. Kennedy Jr. Library.

References

External links

Dearborn Heights Tax Increment Finance Authority (TIFA)
Focus Dearborn Heights

 
Cities in Wayne County, Michigan
Metro Detroit
1960 establishments in Michigan
Populated places established in 1960